Simone Sancioni (born 8 November 1988) is an Italian motorcycle racer.

Career statistics

Grand Prix motorcycle racing

By season

Races by year

References

External links
 

Living people
1988 births
Italian motorcycle racers
125cc World Championship riders
People from Cesena
Sportspeople from the Province of Forlì-Cesena